Takab-e Kuhmish Rural District is a rural district (dehestan) in Sheshtomad County, Razavi Khorasan province, Iran. At the 2006 census, its population was 5,000, in 1,435 families.  The rural district has 9 villages.

References 

Rural Districts of Razavi Khorasan Province
Sabzevar County